Copla (a Spanish word) may refer to:

 Copla (poetry), a poetic form common in Spanish popular writing.
 Copla (music), a musical genre related to that poetic form.